Karl Rudolf Hagenbach (March 4, 1801 – June 7, 1874) was a Swiss church theologian and historian.  He was particularly interested in the Protestant Reformation and its figures.

Life

Hagenbach was born at Basel, where his father was a practising physician, and a professor of anatomy and botany in the university. His preliminary education was at a Pestalozzian school, and afterwards at the gymnasium, whence in due course he passed to the newly reorganized local university. He early devoted himself to theological studies and the service of the church, while at the same time cherishing and developing broad "humanistic" tendencies which found expression in many ways and especially in an enthusiastic admiration for the writings of Herder.

The years 1820–1823 were spent first at Bonn, where G. C. F. Lucke (1791–1855) exerted a powerful influence on his thought, and afterwards at Berlin, where Schleiermacher and Neander became his masters. Returning in 1823 to Basel, where W. M. L. de Wette had recently been appointed to a theological chair, he distinguished himself greatly by his trial dissertation, Observationes historico-hermeneuticae circa Origenis methodum interpretendae sacrae Scripturae; in 1824 he became professor extraordinarius, and in 1829 professor ordinarius of theology.

Apart from his academic labours in connection with the history of dogma and of the church, he lived a life of great and varied usefulness as a theologian, a preacher and a citizen; and at his jubilee in 1873, not only the university and town of Basel but also the various churches of Switzerland united to do him honour. He died at Basel on 7 June 1874.

Works
Hagenbach was a voluminous author, distinguished as a writer on church history. Though neither so learned and condensed as the contributions of Gieseler, nor so original and profound as those of Neander, his lectures are clear, attractive and free from narrow sectarian prejudice. In dogmatics, while avowedly a champion of the mediation theology, based upon the fundamental conceptions of Herder and Schleiermacher, he was much less revolutionary than were many others of his school. He sought to maintain the old confessional documents, and to make the objective prevail over the purely subjective manner of viewing theological questions. But he himself was aware that in the endeavour to do so he was not always successful, and that his delineations of Christian dogma often betrayed a vacillating and uncertain hand.

His works include:

Tabellarische Übersicht der Dogmengeschichte (1828).
Encyclopädie u. Methodologie der theol. Wissenschaften (1833/1889; English trans., 1884/1891). 
Vorlesungen über Wesen u. Geschichte der Reformation u. des Protestantismus (1834–1843; vol. 1–2; vol. 3; vol. 4; English transl., vol. 1, 1878; vol. 2, 1879).
Lehrbuch der Dogmengeschichte (1840–1841, 5th ed., 1867; English transl., vol. 1, 1850, vol. 2, 1861).
Die Kirchengeschichte des 18. und 19. Jahrhunderts: Aus dem Standpunkte des evangelischen Protestantismus (Part I, 1848; English transl., vol. 1, 1870; vol. 2, 1870).
Vorlesungen über die Geschichte der alten Kirche (1853–1855).
Vorlesungen über die Kirchengeschichte des Mittelalters (1860–1861).
German Rationalism, in its Rise, Progress, and Decline, in Relation to Theologians, Scholars, Poets, Philosophers, and the People (1865).
  Grundlinien der Homiletik u. Liturgik (1863)
 Johann Oekolampad und Oswald Myconius, die Reformatoren Basels. Leben und ausgewählte Schriften (1859).
Geschichte der theologische Schule Basels (1860).
Predigten (“Sermons,” Basel, 1858–1875).
Luther und seine Zeit, a book of poems (“Luther and his times,” 1838)
Gedichte (“Poems,” Basel, 1846).

The lectures on church history under the general title Vorlesungen über die Kirchengeschichte von der ältesten Zeit bis zum 19ten Jahrhundert were reissued in seven volumes (1868–1872; vol. 1; vol. 2;vol. 3; vol. 4; vol. 5; vol. 6; vol. 7).

He edited the Kirchenblatt für die reformierte Schweiz (from 1845 to 1868), and also a series of biographies of the reformers of the Reformed Church, with selections from their writings (Leben und Schriften der Väter und Begründer der reformierten Kirche, Elberfeld, 1857–1862, 10 vols.), to which he contributed the lives of Oecolampadius and Oswald Myconius (1859, see above).

Further reading
 R. Staehelin, "Hagenbach, Karl Rudolf," in P. Schaff, J. J. Herzog, A. Hauck, eds., The New Schaff-Herzog Encyclopedia of Religious Knowledge, vol. 5 (New York: Funk and Wagnalls, 1909), p. 115.
 Erinnerungen an K. R. Hagenbach, brief autobiography (Basel, 1874)
 Eppler, a fuller sketch (Gütersloh, 1875)
 Andreas Urs Sommer "Die Ambivalenz der „Vermittlung“. Karl Rudolf Hagenbach (1801–1874)". In: Andreas Urs Sommer (ed.): Im Spannungsfeld von Gott und Welt. Beiträge zu Geschichte und Gegenwart des Frey-Grynaeischen Instituts (Basel: Schwabe 1997, ISBN 3-7965-1063-9) pp. 91–110.

References

1801 births
1874 deaths
Swiss Protestant theologians
19th-century Protestant theologians
19th-century Swiss historians
Swiss male writers
Writers from Basel-Stadt
19th-century male writers